South Africa and Wales have competed against each other in rugby union since 1906. Of the 40 matches played to date, South Africa have won 32, with one draw and seven wins for Wales. Wales won their first away match against South Africa in 2022. Since 2007, the winner has been awarded the Prince William Cup, which was created to celebrate 100 years of rugby between the two nations.

Summary

Overview

Records
Note: Date shown in brackets indicates when the record was or last set. Source:

Results

List of series

References

 
Wales national rugby union team matches
South Africa national rugby union team matches